The Evangelical Church Winning All, previously known as the Evangelical Church of West Africa, is one of the largest Christian denominations in Nigeria, with about ten million members. ECWA is a partner church of the international Christian mission organisation, Serving In Mission (SIM), formerly Sudan Interior Mission. ECWA was founded in 1954 when the SIM-related churches (initially in Nigeria) came together to form an indigenous body. Since that time, mission stations, Bible Schools, academic schools, and medical programs have been transferred to ECWA leadership.

History
The Evangelical Church of West Africa was renamed "Evangelical Church Winning All" (ECWA) because of its wide spread beyond its initial scope. 

It was as a result of a history of ministry and the wide spread gospel of Jesus Christ in Africa by several missionaries.

Walter Gowans, Thomas Kent, and Rowland Bingham came from different parts of Canada and the United States of America in 1893 on what can be termed "evangelical suicide mission".
The statement was coined by Oji Chukwudimma Chukwudike because West Africa, at that time, was known to be heavily infested by malaria and there is almost a 100% possibility that a white man will not survive it as they even called the West African region "the white man's grave." 

These missionaries braved malaria and yellow fever to preach the gospel of the death and resurrection of Jesus Christ under the auspices of the Sudan Interior Mission (SIM) and planted several churches as they preached along. By the mid-20th century these churches became independent to carry on the gospel.

Growth and population

Throughout Nigeria, especially in the central regions, ECWA churches are growing rapidly. Some churches have experienced as much as 400% growth in the last several years. Churches in the Northern parts of the country are also growing. 

There are currently more than six thousand ECWA congregations with more than ten million members. 

ECWA has over ninety District Church Councils (DCC's) hundreds of Local Church Councils (LCC's), thousands of Local Churches (LCs) and hundreds of Prayer Houses (PHs).

Education
Bingham University, Karu was started in 2005 as a way of meeting the soaring need for not only quality, secular education, but education that recognizes and integrates the moral and spiritual values of the Christian faith that fueled its establishment.

Seminaries

ECWA started three Theological Seminaries: ECWA Theological Seminary, Igbaja that started as a School of Prophets in 1918, ECWA Theological Seminary, Kagoro which was established in 1931, and Jos ECWA Theological Seminary in 1980. There are also eight Bible colleges and fifteen theological training institutes.

Health
ECWA's Medical Department coordinates a wide network which includes four hospitals, a Community Health Program with over 110 health clinics, a Central Pharmacy and the School of Nursing and Midwifery. It is also involved in radio, publications for outreach and discipleship, rural development, urban ministries, and cross-cultural missions.

Evangelism
ECWA has the largest mission organization of any African church living up to its name Evangelical. The Evangelical Mission Society (EMS) also termed EMS of ECWA has sent out about 1,600 missionaries.

There are more than 1600 missionaries from ECWA churches who serve in Nigeria and other countries with the Evangelical Missionary Society (EMS), the missionary arm of ECWA.

There has been a serious confrontation between evangelical Christians standing in opposition to the expansion of Sharia law in northern Nigeria by militant Muslims since 1999.

Annual themes
Since the year 1997, ECWA has been having regular annual themes:

See also
ECWA Evangel Hospital, Jos
ECWA Theological Seminary
ECWA Hospital Egbe P. M. B. 202, Egbe, Kogi State
Evangelicalism#Africa

References

External links
 Evangelical Church Winning All
 Serving In Mission
 Bingham University Karu
 Jos ECWA Theological Seminary

Evangelical denominations established in the 20th century
Christian organizations established in 1954
Evangelical denominations in Africa
Protestantism in Nigeria